Bloodstrike may refer to:

 Bloodstrike (Marvel Comics), a Marvel Comics supervillain
 Bloodstrike (Image Comics), an Image Comics team and title
 Bloodstrike (band), a Colorado-based death metal band